Manichaean is a Unicode block containing characters historically used for writing Sogdian, Parthian, and the dialects of Fars.

Block

The block has five variation sequences defined for standardized variants.  They use  (VS1) to denote alternate letter forms:

History
The following Unicode-related documents record the purpose and process of defining specific characters in the Manichaean block:

References 

Unicode blocks